Saint Turiaf of Dol (or Thivisiau, Tuien, Turiav, Turiave, Turiavus, Turien, Turiano, Turiavo; died ) was a Breton abbot and bishop of the ancient Diocese of Dol.

Life

Turiaf was born in Brittany to French nobility in the 8th century. 
He became a monk, abbot and priest.
Saint Sampson ordained him.
He was appointed Bishop of Dol in Brittany, France.
His feast day is 13 July.

Monks of Ramsgate account

The monks of St Augustine's Abbey, Ramsgate wrote in their Book of Saints (1921),

Butler's account

The hagiographer Alban Butler (1710–1773) wrote in his Lives of the Fathers, Martyrs, and Other Principal Saints,

Notes

Sources

 

 

Medieval Breton saints
750 deaths